Jurassic Shift is the fourth studio album by English band Ozric Tentacles. It was first released in 1993 on the band's own label  on Dovetail Records. In 1998 a re-release came from Snapper Music, with one additional track. The album was released yet again in 2004, this time paired with Erpland in Snapper Music's Recall 2CD series. 2008 saw a remastered two CD/DVD set with extra tracks and live performances, plus a 24-page booklet.

In a review for AllMusic, Steven McDonald wrote:

Track listing

 "Sunhair" (Ozric Tentacles) – 5:43
 "Stretchy" (Ed Wynne / Joie Hinton) – 6:51
 "Feng Shui" (Ozric Tentacles) – 10:24
 "Half Light in Thillai" (Ed Wynne) – 5:35
 "Jurassic Shift" (Ozric Tentacles) – 11:05
 "Pteranodon" (Ozric Tentacles) – 5:40
 "Train Oasis" (Ed Wynne) – 2:45
 "Vita Voom" (Ozric Tentacles) – 4:48
 "Feng Shui" [Live, included on re-release] (Ozric Tentacles) – 10:55

Credits
Ed Wynne: Guitars, Koto, Keyboards
Joie Hinton: Keyboards, Samples, Atmospheres
Mervin Pepler: Drums, Ethnic Percussion, Babble
John Egan: Flutes, Babble
Roly Wynne: Bass
Zia Geelani: Bass
Marcus C. Diess: Ethnic Percussion
Generator John: Tambourine

Charts

References

1993 albums
Ozric Tentacles albums